Peter Clarence Gardiner (born 8 July 1968 in Uppsala) is a Swedish actor and dancer.

Biography
Gardiner received his formal training as a contemporary ballet dancer at Balettakademien in Stockholm and has performed at all the large stages in Sweden (Royal Dramatic Theatre, Göteborgsoperan, Uppsala stadsteater, Riksteatern) and at Nye Carte Blanche (Norway) and Isadora Duncan Dance Company (USA).
He also works as an actor. Gardiner started out with soap operas/teenage dramas such as Skilda världar and Nudlar och 08:or and later moved on to  larger roles in Swedish movie projects such as The Swimsuit Issue and Dear Alice (alongside Danny Glover).

References

External links

Swedish male actors
1968 births
Living people
Swedish male dancers
Balettakademien